The culture of Odesa is a unique blend of Russian, Yiddish, and Ukrainian cultures, and Odesa itself has played a notable role in Russian and Yiddish folklore.

Dialects
The Russian language as spoken in Odesa is influenced by Yiddish and Ukrainian in grammar, vocabulary, and phraseology. As a result, many phrases sound inherently and uniquely humorous to Russian speakers and constitute a staple of Odesa humour. Also, the Odesa dialect of Yiddish has plenty of Russianisms.

Cultural image of Odesa
To a significant extent the image of Odesa in Russophone culture is influenced by The Odesa Tales of Isaac Babel. Odesa is often referred to by the collocation "Odesa Mama" (Mom Odesa), a term that originated in Russian criminal (blatnoy) subculture. The reputation of the city as a criminal center originated in Imperial Russian times and the early Soviet era, and is similar to the reputation of Al Capone era Chicago.

Odesa humor
Odesa humor is a notable part of both Jewish humor and Russian humor.

Since 1972 Odesa has been hosting the annual festival of humor, Humorina. For this and other reasons  Odesa was known as the "capital of humor" in the Soviet Union.

"Odesa Mama"

Many places in Odesa are memorable not only for their intrinsic cultural value, but also for their place in Odesa folklore. 
Duc de Richelieu monument
Derybasivska Street
Moldovanka
Odesa catacombs
Potemkin Stairs
Prymorskyi Boulevard
Pryvoz Market

References

Further reading
 Maurice Friedberg, "How Things Were Done in Odesa: Cultural and Intellectual Pursuits in a Soviet City" (1991)  (The book is about the life and culture of Odesa of the Soviet era. Its title is an allusion to a Babel's short story "How Things Were Done in Odesa" from The Odesa Tales)
 Anatoli Barbakaru, "Odesa-Mama: Kataly, Kidaly, Shulera" (1999)  
 Rebecca Stanton, "Identity Crisis: The Literary Cult and Culture of Odesa in the Early Twentieth Century", Symposium: A Quarterly Journal in Modern Foreign Literatures 57, No. 3 (2003) pp. 117-126.
 Brian Horowitz, ''Myths and Counter-Myths about Odesa's Jewish Intelligentsia during the Late-Tsarist Period,'' Jewish Culture and History 16, 3-4, 2014, 210-224.        
Humor in Odesa: Traditions and Modern Times

 
Jewish culture
Russian culture
Ukrainian culture